Sérgio Dutra dos Santos, known as Serginho or Escadinha (born 15 October 1975) is a former Brazilian volleyball player. As a member of Brazil men's national volleyball team, he won gold medals at the 2004 and 2016 Olympics and silver medals at the 2008 and 2012 editions.

Additionally, he's a two-time World Champion (2006, 2010) and a multimedalist of the World League, South American Championship, World Cup and the Grand Champions Cup. In 2009 he became the first libero to be named Most Valuable Player in the history of the FIVB World League.

Career
He is widely regarded as one of the best liberos of all time and is unquestionably the best libero of the 2000s, with more awards than any other libero. Known for his outstanding service reception and digging capabilities, teams often attempt to avoid Sergio when serving. Beyond his defensive abilities, he is also capable of running the offense as a 'second setter' if the setter is forced to make the first contact. This is in large part due to Sergio playing the setting position while growing up and subbing in as a setter for his professional club teams over the years.

Sergio is multimedialist of every volleyball tournament in the 2000s. He is seven-time South American Champion and he won with Brazil every South American Championship during his whole career in the national team. In 2002 and 2006 he achieved titles of World Champion. During his career, he achieved 7 gold and 3 silver medals of FIVB World League.
In his achievements are also medals in World Cup, World Grand Champions Cup, and Pan American Games.

In 2004 he became an Olympic Champion for the first time. However, in the next two Olympics, the Brazilian national volleyball team won silver medals only. Serginho semi-retired from the national team after the 2012 Olympics, and returned only for the 2015 World League. After that he declined to compete at the 2016 Rio Olympics, but was persuaded by Bernardinho to return. Bernardinho claimed that, while Serginho no longer had the agility that made him famous, he had experience and maturity to lead the team during a tournament that would certainly be rife with pressure on the Brazilian team, since they were playing on their country and coming from two losses on previous Olympics. Serginho was essential to motivate his team against France. They were losing, and on a break, Serginho told his colleagues that, while they all had at least one more chance at going to the Olympics, he didn't – those would be his last Olympic Games. Eventually, Brazil won the gold medal against Italy, and Serginho was acclaimed by the cheering fans, who called him king. After the match against Italy, Serginho was named the tournament's most valued player. He announced after the Rio finals against Italy he will play professionally for two more years.

Sporting achievements

Clubs

CEV Champions League
  2007/2008 – with Copra Piacenza

CEV Top Teams Cup
  2005/2006 – with Copra Piacenza

National championships
 1993/1994  Brazilian Championship, with SE Palmeiras
 1994/1995  Brazilian Championship, with SE Palmeiras
 2001/2002  Brazilian Championship, with CRET São Caetano
 2002/2003  Brazilian Championship, with CRET São Caetano
 2004/2005  Italian Championship, with Copra Piacenza
 2006/2007  Italian Championship, with Copra Piacenza
 2007/2008  Italian Championship, with Copra Piacenza
 2010/2011  Brazilian Championship, with SESI São Paulo 
 2012/2013  Brazilian Championship, with SESI São Paulo 
 2013/2014  Brazilian Championship, with SESI São Paulo 
 2014/2015  Brazilian Championship, with SESI São Paulo

National team
 2001  America's Cup
 2001  FIVB World League
 2001  South American Championship
 2002  FIVB World League
 2002  FIVB World Championship
 2003  Pan American Games
 2003  FIVB World League
 2003  South American Championship
 2003  FIVB World Cup
 2004  FIVB World League
 2004  Olympic Games
 2005  America's Cup
 2005  FIVB World League
 2005  South American Championship
 2005  FIVB World Grand Champions Cup
 2006  FIVB World League
 2006  FIVB World Championship
 2007  Pan American Games
 2007  FIVB World League
 2007  South American Championship
 2007  FIVB World Cup
 2008  America's Cup
 2008  Olympic Games
 2009  FIVB World League
 2009  South American Championship
 2009  FIVB World Grand Champions Cup
 2010  FIVB World League
 2010  FIVB World Championship
 2011  FIVB World League
 2011  South American Championship
 2011  FIVB World Cup
 2012  Olympic Games
 2015  South American Championship
 2016  FIVB World League
 2016  Olympic Games

Individual
 2001 Brazilian League – Best Libero
 2001 America's Cup – Best Digger
 2002 Brazilian League – Best Libero
 2002 Brazilian League – Best Digger
 2002 FIVB World League – Best Digger
 2003 Brazilian League – Best Libero
 2003 Brazilian League – Best Receiver
 2003 Pan American Games – Best Libero
 2003 FIVB World League – Best Digger
 2003 FIVB World League – Best Receiver
 2003 FIVB World Cup – Best Libero
 2004 Olympic Games – Best Digger
 2004 Olympic Games – Best Receiver
 2004 Olympic Games – Best Libero
 2006 CEV Top Teams Cup – Best Libero
 2007 Pan American Games – Best Receiver
 2007 Pan American Games – Best Libero
 2007 South American Championship – Best Libero
 2007 FIVB World Cup – Best Libero
 2008 CEV Champions League – Best Libero
 2008 America's Cup – Best Receiver
 2008 America's Cup – Best Libero
 2009 FIVB World League – Most Valuable Player
 2009 South American Championship – Best Libero
 2009 FIVB World Grand Champions Cup – Best Libero
 2010 Brazilian League – Best Digger
 2011 Brazilian League – Best Digger
 2011 South American Club Championship – Best Digger
 2011 South American Club Championship – Best Libero
 2011 South American Championship – Best Digger
 2011 South American Championship – Best Receiver
 2011 South American Championship – Best Libero
 2011 South American Championship – Most Valuable Player
 2011 FIVB World Cup – Best Receiver
 2011 FIVB Club World Championship – Best Receiver
 2011 FIVB Club World Championship – Best Libero
 2015 South American Championship – Most Valuable Player
 2016 Olympic Games – Best Libero
 2016 Olympic Games – Most Valuable Player

References

External links

 FIVB profile
 

1975 births
Living people
Volleyball players at the 2004 Summer Olympics
Volleyball players at the 2008 Summer Olympics
Volleyball players at the 2012 Summer Olympics
Olympic volleyball players of Brazil
Olympic gold medalists for Brazil
Olympic silver medalists for Brazil
Volleyball players at the 2003 Pan American Games
Volleyball players at the 2007 Pan American Games
Olympic medalists in volleyball
Brazilian men's volleyball players
Liberos
Medalists at the 2012 Summer Olympics
Medalists at the 2008 Summer Olympics
Medalists at the 2004 Summer Olympics
Pan American Games bronze medalists for Brazil
Pan American Games gold medalists for Brazil
Volleyball players at the 2016 Summer Olympics
Medalists at the 2016 Summer Olympics
Brazilian expatriates in Italy
Expatriate volleyball players in Italy
Pan American Games medalists in volleyball
Medalists at the 2003 Pan American Games
Medalists at the 2007 Pan American Games